is a video game for the Game Boy Advance portable handheld system, part of the Dynasty Warriors series. The game was published by Nintendo, and developed by Koei using their external development company Omega Force. It was released on August 29, 2005.

Reception

Dynasty Warriors Advance received very mixed reviews upon release. IGN disliked the game, grading it 4 out of 10, criticizing the low number of on-screen enemies at any time, and the "button-mashing" gameplay. Nintendo Power, however, gave the game a 7 (out of 10), praising its replay value that "ranks among the best" on the Game Boy Advance system. The game currently has a score of 56 out of 100 at Metacritic, and 55% at GameRankings.

References

External links
Koei's Official site 
 Official website of Japan 
 Official website of Taiwan 

2005 video games
Koei games
Game Boy Advance games
Game Boy Advance-only games
Dynasty Warriors
Nintendo games
Video games developed in Japan
Video games set in China